King's College, Warrnambool, is an independent co-educational Christian school located in Warrnambool, Victoria, Australia. It was founded in 1986 and provides education from Kindergarten through to Year 12.

Campus

King's College has one campus, located in Warrnambool. It is set on a large site (14 hectares).

History

In 1983, members of the Presbyterian church in Warrnambool began discussing the possibility of establishing a Christian school for the Warrnambool community. The school was registered in August 1984 as 'Warrnambool Presbyterian School Ltd'. The following year, the Balmoral Road location was purchased for $93,000.

In 1986, King's College opened, using a small room they had rented in town. Initially, there were 19 students. The year after, they moved to the Balmoral Road site, where some portable classrooms were set up and the first building, a toilet block, was constructed. There were 26 students that year.

1990 saw the appointment of King's College's first principal, Peter Bosker. There were 106 students enrolled that year. Bosker served as principal for 3 years with Neil Benfell later taking over. Benfell was not new to the school, however, as the founding of the school is largely attributed to him.

In 1997, King's College began to offer preschool classes, and in 1998, they began to branch into secondary schooling. This involved an initial class of Year 7s in 1998, who became the first of each year level as they progressed through. This meant that the first year 12s graduated from King's College in December 2003.

Ian McKay took over as principal from 2011 to 2016, when Neil Benfell retired after serving the college for almost two decades.

In 2017, Allister Rouse was appointed as the current Principal.

Governance

King’s College is a school, owned and operated by Warrnambool Presbyterian School Ltd, a non-profit company formed to run the school.

The Directors of the company, who are the College Board, comprise up to ten members appointed for a three-year term by the Members. The Constitution provides for six Directors from the Presbytery of South West Victoria and up to four Directors from other Protestant denominations, reflecting the desire to include all Protestant Christians in the College and its policy-making process, and to ensure a wide range of skills of Board members.

The Board is not involved in the day-to-day operations of the College. The role of the Board is in strategic oversight, compliance and financial oversight. The Board operates through several sub-committees including governance, assets and finance and child safety committees. The Board delegates the day-to-day operation of the College to the Principal as Chief Executive Officer of the Company

External links
Website
Facebook

Private secondary schools in Victoria (Australia)
Education in Warrnambool
Presbyterian schools in Australia
Educational institutions established in 1986
1986 establishments in Australia